The Muurola railway station, elevation 38 metres above sea level, is located in the district of Muurola in the city of Rovaniemi in Lapland, Finland. The distance to the Helsinki Central railway station is 948.5 kilometres, measured via the Haapamäki and Seinäjoki railway station.

Almost all passenger trains between Kemi and Rovaniemi stop at Muurola for customer service. The station does not serve cargo traffic. The traffic control is handled remotely from the Oulu railway station.

References

External links
 Pictures from the Muurola station

Railway stations in Lapland (Finland)
Rovaniemi